Stephen Gerard Pagliuca (born January 16, 1955) is an American private equity investor, co-chairman of Bain Capital, and co-owner of the Boston Celtics of the National Basketball Association (NBA) and Atalanta of Italian Serie A association football league.

Education
Raised in the Basking Ridge section of Bernards Township, New Jersey, Pagliuca graduated from Ridge High School in 1973. He attended Duke University where he played freshman basketball before receiving a BA in 1977. He has served on Duke's Trinity Board of Investors from 2001 to 2008, chairing the board from 2005 to 2007. He is a member of the Campaign Steering Committee and also serves on the board of trustees, serving on the Audit Committee and the Institutional Advancement Committee.

Pagliuca received an MBA from Harvard Business School (HBS) in 1982. He is member of the HBS Board of Dean's Advisors, the University Board of Overseers Committee on University Resources and the HBS Healthcare Initiative Advisory Board. He serves on the MGH President's Council and co-chairs the HBS Fund.

Career
Pagliuca started his career as a senior accountant and international tax specialist at Peat Marwick Mitchell & Company in the Netherlands (Peat Marwick is today KPMG).

Following this, he joined Bain & Company, a global consulting firm, in 1982 where he managed client relationships in the information services and healthcare industries. Pagliuca also was involved in the creation of Bain & Company's turnaround practice.  He then founded the Information Partners Venture Capital Fund and joined Bain Capital in 1989, where he began investing in numerous companies in the media, technology, financial services and healthcare industries.  In 2016, he was named co-chairman of the firm.

He is a former member of the Board of Directors of Burger King, Warner Chilcott, Gartner Group and the Hospital Corporation of America.

In 2009, Pagliuca was a Democratic candidate for the U.S. Senate position formerly occupied by Ted Kennedy. He is a member of Congressman Joe Kennedy's Finance Committee, the Campaign to Fix the Debt and the Democratic National Advisory Committee.

Boston Celtics

Pagliuca is the managing general partner and member of the executive committee of the Boston Celtics and serves as a member of the Board of Governors and the Competition Committee for the National Basketball Association.

Atalanta
On 19 February 2022, Pagliuca, together with a number of other investors, acquired a 55% stake of Italian Serie A association football club Atalanta. Under the new agreement, Pagliuca was named co-chairman of the club.

Philanthropy
Pagliuca is a member of HBS’ Board of Dean's Advisors, Harvard University's Board of Overseers’ Committee on University Resources, the HBS Healthcare Initiative Advisory Board and co-chair of the HBS Fund.  He is a member of Duke University's board of trustees and serves on Massachusetts General Hospital's President's Council.

In 2005, Pagliuca received the Bright Star Award as recognition for his charitable activities from Bill Clinton.  In 2010, Habitat Humanity presented him with the American Dream Award for outstanding contributions to the Greater Boston Community.

He was co-chair of the Boston 2024 Olympics Finance Committee until Boston's bid for the 2024 Olympics was thrown out by the IOC.  

See also
Bain Capital
Boston Celtics
United States Senate special election in Massachusetts, 2010

References
Notes

Bibliography

 Private equity power list (Fortune magazine)
 Bain Capital wraps up $20bn fundraising(Financial News), January 31, 2008
 What is Pagliuca’s political identity? (Boston.com) September 20, 2009
 NBA Profile
 Fellowship of the Ring (Boston.com)

1955 births
Living people
American sports businesspeople
Bain & Company employees
Boston Celtics owners
Ridge High School alumni
Duke University alumni
Harvard Business School alumni
Massachusetts Democrats
National Basketball Association executives
People from Bernards Township, New Jersey
People from Framingham, Massachusetts
Private equity and venture capital investors
Basketball people from Massachusetts
People named in the Paradise Papers